Abolfazl Ebrahimi; is an Iranian football midfielder who currently plays for the Iranian football club Paykan  in the Iran Pro League.

Club career

Saba Qom
Abolfazl Ebrahimi joined Saba Qom in summer 2012 with a 2-year contract. In summer 2014 he signed a one year contract extension which kept him in Saba Qom until summer 2015.

Club career statistics

References

External links
 Abolfazl Ebrahimi  at IranLeague.ir Abolfazl Ebrahimi on Instagram

Living people
Iranian footballers
Aluminium Hormozgan F.C. players
Saba players
Persian Gulf Pro League players
1982 births
Association football midfielders
People from Qazvin